Nuwakot is a former village development committee in Western Rukum District in Karnali Province of western Nepal. At the time of the 2011 Nepal census it had a population of 5709 people living in 1059 individual households..

References

Populated places in Western Rukum District